Encuentros muy cercanos con señoras de cualquier tipo is a 1978 Argentine film.

Cast
Adriana Aguirre

External links
 

1978 films
Argentine comedy films
1970s Spanish-language films
1970s Argentine films